Cooper (formerly, Coopers) is an unincorporated community in Monterey County, California, United States. The elevation is 23 feet (7 m).

References

Unincorporated communities in Monterey County, California
Salinas Valley
Unincorporated communities in California